Hever may refer to:

Hever, Kent, a village and civil parish in the Sevenoaks District of Kent, England
Hever, Belgium, a small village in the center of Flanders, Belgium  
Merkaz Hever, a communal settlement in Israel
Nahal Hever, a stream in the Judean Desert 
 Hévér, the Hungarian name for Iertof village, Vrani Commune, Caraş-Severin County, Romania

See also
Heber (disambiguation)